Lungmar is a village and township in the Tibet Autonomous Region of China.

See also
List of towns and villages in Tibet

Populated places in Shigatse
Township-level divisions of Tibet